Dame Catherine Ann Cookson, DBE (née McMullen; 20 June 1906 – 11 June 1998) was a British writer. She is in the top 20 of the most widely read British novelists, with sales topping 100 million, while retaining a relatively low profile in the world of celebrity writers. Her books were inspired by her deprived youth in South Shields (historically part of County Durham), North East England, the setting for her novels. With 104 titles written in her own name or two other pen names, she is one of the most prolific British novelists.

Early life
Cookson, registered as Catherine Ann Davies, was born on 20 June 1906 at 5 Leam Lane in Tyne Dock, South Shields, County Durham, England. She was known as "Katie" as a child. She moved to East Jarrow, which would become the setting for one of her best-known novels, The Fifteen Streets. The illegitimate child of an alcoholic named Kate Fawcett, she grew up thinking her unmarried mother was her sister, as she was brought up by her grandparents, Rose and John McMullen. Biographer Kathleen Jones tracked down her father, whose name was Alexander Davies, a bigamist and gambler from Lanarkshire, Scotland.

She left school at 14 and, after a period of domestic service, took a laundry job at Harton Workhouse in South Shields. In 1929, she moved south to run the laundry at Hastings Workhouse, saving every penny to buy a large Victorian house, and then taking in lodgers to supplement her income.

In June 1940, at the age of 34, she married Tom Cookson, a teacher at Hastings Grammar School. After experiencing four miscarriages late in pregnancy, it was discovered she was suffering from a rare vascular disease, telangiectasia, which causes bleeding from the nose, fingers and stomach and results in anaemia. A mental breakdown followed the miscarriages, from which it took her a decade to recover.

Writing career
She took up writing as a form of therapy, in order to tackle her depression, and became a founding member of Hastings Writers' Group. Her first novel, Kate Hannigan, was published in 1950. Though it was labelled a romance, she expressed discontent with the stereotype. Her books were, she said, historical novels about people and conditions she knew. Cookson had little connection with the London literary circus. She was always more interested in practising the art of writing. Her research could be uncomfortable—going down a mine, for instance, because her heroine came from a mining area. Having in her youth wanted to write about 'above stairs' in grand houses, she later and successfully concentrated on people ground down by circumstances, taking care to know them well. 

Cookson wrote almost 100 books, which sold more than 123 million copies, her novels being translated into at least 20 languages. She also wrote books under the pseudonyms Catherine Marchant and a name derived from her childhood name, Katie McMullen. She remained the most borrowed author from public libraries in the UK for 17 years, up until four years after her death, losing the top spot to Jacqueline Wilson only in 2002.

Books in film, television and on stage
Many of Cookson's novels have been adapted for film, radio, and the stage. The first film adaptation of her work was Jacqueline (1956), directed by Roy Ward Baker, based on her book A Grand Man.
It was followed by Rooney (1958), directed by George Pollock, based on her book Rooney. Both starred John Gregson. For commercial reasons, the action of both films was transferred from South Shields to Ireland.

In 1983 Katie Mulholland was adapted into a stage musical by composer Eric Boswell and writer-director Ken Hill. Cookson attended the première.

It was on television, however, that she had her greatest media success, with a series of dramas that appeared over the course of a decade on ITV and achieved huge ratings. Eighteen books were adapted for television between 1989 and 2001. They were all produced by Ray Marshall from Festival Film & TV who was given permission by Cookson in 1988 to bring her works to the screen. The first film to be made, The Fifteen Streets starring Sean Bean and Owen Teale, was nominated for an Emmy award in 1990. The second production, The Black Velvet Gown, won an International Emmy for Best Drama in 1991. The mini series regularly attracted audiences over 10 million and are still showing in the UK on Drama and the Yesterday Channel.

Philanthropy
In 1985, she pledged more than £800,000 to the University of Newcastle. In gratitude, the university set up a lectureship in hematology. Some £40,000 was given to provide a laser to help treat bleeding disorders and £50,000 went to create a new post in ear, nose and throat studies, with particular reference to the detection of deafness in children. She had already given £20,000 towards the university's Hatton Gallery and £32,000 to its library. In recognition of this generosity, a building in the university medical faculty has been named after her. Her foundation continues to make donations to worthy causes in the UK, particularly those offering services to young people and cultural ventures, such as the Tyneside Cinema.

Honours
She was created an Officer of the Order of the British Empire in 1985, and was elevated to Dame Commander of the Order of the British Empire in 1993.

Cookson received the Freedom of the Borough of South Tyneside, and an honorary degree from the University of Newcastle. The Variety Club of Great Britain named her Writer of the Year, and she was voted Personality of the North East.

She was the subject of This Is Your Life in 1982 when she was surprised by Eamonn Andrews.

Later life and death
In later life, Cookson and her husband Tom returned to the North East and settled first in Haldane Terrace, Jesmond, Newcastle upon Tyne. They then moved to Corbridge, a market town near Newcastle, and later to Langley, Northumberland, a small village nearby. As her health declined, they moved for a final time, back to Jesmond in 1989 to be nearer to medical facilities. For the last few years of her life, she was bed-ridden and she gave her final TV interview to North East Tonight, the regional ITV Tyne Tees news programme, from her sickbed. It was conducted by Mike Neville.

Cookson died at the age of 91, sixteen days before her 92nd birthday, at her home in Newcastle. Her novels, many written from her sickbed, continued to be published posthumously until 2002. Her husband Tom died just 17 days later, on 28 June 1998. He had been hospitalised for a week and the cause of his death was not announced. He was 86 years old.

Legacy

In 1992 the inaugural Catherine Cookson Prize took place and was won by author Val Wood and her debut novel, The Hungry Tide, which subsequently went on to become a best-seller. 

In March 2008, the Dame Catherine Cookson Memorial Garden was unveiled in the grounds of South Tyneside District Hospital in South Shields, based on the theme of a serpentine symbol, commonly used to symbolise health and caring. The hospital occupies the site of the Harton Workhouse, where Cookson worked from 1924 to 1929. The project was partly funded by the Catherine Cookson Trust.

Tom and Catherine, a musical about the couple's life, was written by local playwright Tom Kelly. It played to sell-out crowds at the Customs House in South Shields.

Portrayals in fiction
Cookson was portrayed by actress Kerry Browne in the 2018 award-winning film Our Catherine, co-written by Tom Kelly.

Bibliography

Written as Catherine Cookson
 The Fifteen Streets (1952)
 Colour Blind (1953)
 Maggie Rowan (1954)
 Rooney (1957)
 The Menagerie (1958)
 Fanny McBride (1959)
 Fenwick Houses (1960)
 The Garment (1962)
 The Blind Miller (1963)
 The Wingless Bird (1964)
 Hannah Massey (1964)
 The Mists of Memory (1965)
 The Long Corridor (1965)
 Matty Doolin (1965)
 The Unbaited Trap (1966)
 Slinky Jane (1967)
 Katie Mulholland (1967)
 The Round Tower (1968)
 The Nice Bloke (1969) aka The Husband (1969)
 The Glass Virgin (1969)
 The Invitation (1970)
 The Dwelling Place (1971)
 Feathers in the Fire (1971)
 Pure as the Lily (1972)
 The Invisible Cord (1975)
 The Gambling Man (1975)
 The Tide of Life (1976)
 The Girl (1977)
 The Cinder Path (1978)
 The Man Who Cried (1979)
 The Whip (1983) aka The Spaniard's Gift (1989)
 The Black Velvet Gown (1984)
 The Bannaman Legacy (1985) aka A Dinner of Herbs (1985)
 The Moth (1986) a.k.a. The Thorman Inheritance (1989)
 The Parson's Daughter (1987)
 The Harrogate Secret (1988) aka The Secret aka The Smuggler's Secret
 The Cultured Handmaiden (1988)
 The Spaniard's Gift (1989) aka The Whip (1983)
 The Black Candle (1989)
 The Thorman Inheritance (1989) aka The Moth (1986)
 The Gillyvors (1990) aka The Love Child (1991)
 My Beloved Son (1991)
 The Rag Nymph (1991) aka The Forester Girl (1993)
 The House of Women (1992)
 The Maltese Angel (1992)
 The Golden Straw (1993)
 The Forester Girl (1993) aka The Rag Nymph (1991)
 The Year of the Virgins (1993)
 The Tinker's Girl (1994)
 Justice Is a Woman (1994)
 A Ruthless Need (1995)
 The Bonny Dawn (1996)
 The Branded Man (1996)
 The Lady on my Left (1997)
 The Obsession (1995)
 The Upstart (1998)
 The Blind Years (1998)
 Riley (1998)
 Solace of Sin (1998)
 The Desert Crop (1999)
 The Thursday Friend (1999)
 My Land of the North (1999)
 A House Divided (2000)
 Rosie of the River (2000)
 The Simple Soul and Other Stories (2001)
 The Silent Lady (2002)

The Kate Hannigan series
 Kate Hannigan (1950)
 Kate Hannigan's Girl (2001)

The Mary Ann stories
 A Grand Man (1954)
 The Lord and Mary Ann (1956)
 The Devil and Mary Ann (1958)
 Love and Mary Ann (1961)
 Life and Mary Ann (1962)
 Marriage and Mary Ann (1964)
 Mary Ann's Angels (1965)
 Mary Ann and Bill (1967)

The Mallen Novels
 The Mallen Streak (1973)
 The Mallen Girl (1974)
 The Mallen Litter (1974)

The Tilly Trotter trilogy
 Tilly Trotter aka Tilly (1980)
 Tilly Trotter Wed aka Tilly Wed (1981)
 Tilly Trotter Widowed aka Tilly Alone (1982)

The Hamilton series
 Hamilton (1983)
 Goodbye Hamilton (1984)
 Harold (1985)

The Bill Bailey trilogy
 Bill Bailey (1986)
 Bill Bailey's Lot (1987) aka Bill Bailey's Litter
 Bill Bailey's Daughter (1988)
 The Bondage of Love (1997)

Children's stories
 Joe and the Gladiator (1968)
 The Nipper (1970)
 Blue Baccy (1972) aka Rory's Fortune (1988)
 Our John Willie (1974)
 Mrs Flannagan's Trumpet (1976)
 Go Tell It to Mrs Golightly (1977)
 Lanky Jones (1981)
 Nancy Nutall and the Mongrel (1982)
 Rory's Fortune (1988) aka Blue Baccy (1972)
 Bill and The Mary Ann Shaughnessy (1991)

Autobiographies
 Our Kate (1969)
 Catherine Cookson Country (1986) aka My Land of the North (1999)
 Let Me Make Myself Plain (1988)
 Plainer Still (1995)
 Just A Saying (2002)

Written as Catherine Marchant
 Heritage of Folly (1961) aka Heritage of Folly (1961) by Katie McMullen
 The Fen Tiger (1963) aka The House on the Fens (1963)
 House of Men (1963)
 The Mists of Memory (1965) aka The Lady on my Left (1997) by Catherine Cookson
 The Iron Facade (1965) aka Evil at Rodgers Cross (1965)
 Miss Martha Mary Crawford (1975)
 The Slow Awakening (1976)

Written as Katie McMullen
 Heritage of Folly by Catherine Marchant

Biographies
 To Be a Lady: Biography of Catherine Cookson by Cliff Goodwin (1994)
 The Girl From Leam Lane: The Life and Writing of Catherine Cookson by Piers Dudgeon (1997)
 Catherine Cookson by Kathleen Jones (1999)
 Kate's Daughter: The Real Catherine Cookson by Piers Dudgeon (2003)
 Seeking Catherine Cookson's Da by Kathleen Jones (2004)

Documentary
 The Storyteller (1999) narrated by Mike Neville

Books in film and television
All titles from The Mallens onwards have been released on DVD in the UK and various other countries.
 Jacqueline (1956) adaptation of A Grand Man with John Gregson, Kathleen Ryan, Noel Purcell and Cyril Cusack
 Rooney (1958) with John Gregson, Muriel Pavlow, Barry Fitzgerald and June Thorburn
 Joe and the Gladiator (1971) with James Garbutt, Malcolm Terris and John Cazabon
 Romance: House of Men (1977) with Michael Kitchen, James Laurenson, Alun Armstrong and Joe Gladwin
 Our John Willie (1980) with Ian Cullen, David Burke, James Garbutt, John Malcolm and Malcolm Terris
 The Mallens (1979–1980) with John Hallam, John Duttine, David Rintoul and Juliet Stevenson
 The Fifteen Streets (1989) with Sean Bean, Owen Teale, Clare Holman and Jane Horrocks
 The Black Velvet Gown (1991) with Janet McTeer, Bob Peck, Geraldine Somerville won the International Emmy award for best drama.
 The Black Candle (1991) with Nathaniel Parker and Samantha Bond
 The Man Who Cried (1993) with Ciarán Hinds and Amanda Root
 The Cinder Path (1994) with Catherine Zeta-Jones  
 The Dwelling Place (1994) with Tracy Whitwell, Julie Hesmondhalgh and Ray Stevenson
 The Glass Virgin (1995) with Nigel Havers, Emily Mortimer and Brendan Coyle
 The Gambling Man (1995) with Robson Green
 The Tide of Life (1996) with Gillian Kearney, John Bowler, Ray Stevenson and James Purefoy
 The Girl (1996) with Jonathan Cake, Malcolm Stoddard, Jill Baker and Siobhan Flynn
 The Wingless Bird (1997) with Claire Skinner, Anne Reid and Julian Wadham
 The Rag Nymph (1997) with Honeysuckle Weeks, Alec Newman and Val McLane
 The Moth (1997) with Jack Davenport, Juliet Aubrey and Justine Waddell
 The Round Tower (1998) with Emilia Fox, Ben Miles and Denis Lawson
 Colour Blind (1998) with Niamh Cusack, Tony Armatrading, Art Malik, Dearbhla Molloy, and Carmen Ejogo
 Tilly Trotter (1999) with Carli Norris, Beth Goddard, Sarah Alexander, Amelia Bullmore, Rosemary Leach and Simon Shepherd
 A Dinner of Herbs (2000) with Jonathan Kerrigan, Melanie Clark Pullen, Debra Stephenson, David Threlfall and Billie Whitelaw
 The Secret (2000) with Colin Buchanan, Hannah Yelland, Elizabeth Carling, Clare Higgins, and Stephen Moyer

References

External links

1906 births
1998 deaths
20th-century British novelists
20th-century British women writers
20th-century pseudonymous writers
British Book Award winners
British historical novelists
British people of Scottish descent
British women novelists
Dames Commander of the Order of the British Empire
People from Corbridge
Writers from Northumberland
People from South Shields
Writers from Tyne and Wear
Pseudonymous women writers
Women historical novelists